Aberbowlan is a small village in Carmarthenshire. It is located in the north of the county,  to the north-east of the town of Llandovery on a road that links Hafod Bridge on the A482 and Caio.

Villages in Carmarthenshire